Coronel Pringles is a partido of the Province of Buenos Aires in Argentina. In the southern part of the province, it was founded on 10 July 1882 by the provincial government when they divided the territory of Tres Arroyos into the partidos of Coronel Suárez, Tres Arroyos, and Coronel Pringles.

Settlements
Coronel Pringles
Coronel Falcón
El Divisorio
El pensamiento
Indio Rico
Krabbe
Lartigau
Las Mostazas
Pillahuinco
Reserva
Stegmann

References
Census INDEC 2001. Censo Nacional de Población, Hogares y Viviendas del año 2001 (in Spanish). Instituto Nacional de Estadística y Censos.

External links
 Coronel Pringles Municipality

Partidos of Buenos Aires Province